Alison Bartosik (born April 20, 1983) is an American competitor in synchronized swimming.

She won two Olympic bronze medals at the 2004 Summer Olympics, one in duet with Anna Kozlova, and one in the team competition.

References

External links

1983 births
Living people
Olympic bronze medalists for the United States in synchronized swimming
American synchronized swimmers
Synchronized swimmers at the 2004 Summer Olympics
Sportspeople from Arizona
Medalists at the 2004 Summer Olympics
Pan American Games medalists in synchronized swimming
Pan American Games gold medalists for the United States
Synchronized swimmers at the 2003 Pan American Games
Medalists at the 2003 Pan American Games
21st-century American women